The anime series The Knight in the Area is based on the manga series of the same name written by Hiroaki Igano and illustrated by Kaya Tsukiyama. The series is directed by Hirofumi Ogura and animated by Shin-Ei Animation. The story follows Kakeru Aizawa, who received the heart of his soccer prodigy older brother Suguru Aizawa after an accident. He aims to achieve his brother's dream of winning the World Cup.

The adaption of the series into an anime was first announced in Weekly Shōnen Magazine's 43rd issue in 2011. On January 5, 2012, Crunchyroll announced it will simulcast The Knight in the Area. The series aired between January 7, 2012, and September 28, 2012, on TV Asahi. The episodes used  by S.R.S as the opening theme.



Episode list

Volume DVDs
Bandai Visual gathered the episodes and released them into DVD volumes. The first DVD volume was released on May 25, 2012.

References

Lists of anime episodes